Backhouse was launched in 1798 at Dartmouth. In all, she made four voyages as a slave ship. Between the second and the third, and after the fourth, she was a West Indiaman. A French privateer captured her early in 1810 as she was returning to Britain from Brazil.

Career
Backhouse first appeared in Lloyd's Register (LR) in 1799.

1st enslaving voyage (1799–1800): Captain John Harvey sailed from Liverpool on 10 May 1799, bound for West Africa. Backhouse acquired captives at Anomabu and arrived at Saint Croix on 20 November with 257 captives. At some point Captain Crocker replaced Harvey. Backhouse, Crocke, master, arrived back at Liverpool on 8 March 1800. She had left Liverpool with 32 crew members and she had suffered two crew deaths on the voyage.

At the time Saint Croix was a Danish colony. In 1792, the Danish government passed a law that would outlaw Danish participation in the trans-Atlantic enslaving trade, from early 1803 on. This led the government in the Danish West Indies to encourage the importation of captives prior to the ban taking effect. One measure that it took was to open the trade to foreign vessels. Records for the period 1796 to 1799 show that 24 British enslaving ships, most of them from Liverpool, arrived at St Croix and imported 6,781 captives.

2nd enslaving voyage (1800–1802): Captain Henry Tyrer sailed from Liverpool on 22 October 1800. Backhouse acquired captives at the Cameroons, and then Rio Dande (Northern Angola). She arrived at Grenada on 16 September 1801, and left on 7 November. She arrived back at Liverpool on 22 January 1802.

Without original research it is currently impossible to determine Backhouses employment between her return from her second slave trading voyage and 1805. The registers were only as accurate as owners chose to keep them. In 1805 Backhouse, Keen, master, sailed between Liverpool and Berbice.

3rd enslaving voyage (1806–1807): Captain Thomas Roberts acquired a letter of marque on 26 March 1806. He sailed from Liverpool on 26 April 1806. Backhouse acquired captives at Bonny. On 2 October 1806 Captain Roberts died. Captain William Foster replaced Roberts. 

Backhouse arrived at Kingston, Jamaica on 31 October with 312 captives. She sailed from Kingston on 28 January 1807 and arrived back at Liverpool on 6 April. She had left Liverpool with 37 crew members and she suffered seven crew deaths on the voyage.

4th enslaving voyage (1807–1808): Captain James Mackie sailed from Liverpool on 18 May 1807. The Slave Trade Act 1807 had abolished British participation in the transatlantic slave trade, effective 1 May 1807. However, vessels such as Backhouse, which had received a clearance to sail before the deadline, could still depart. 

Backhouse acquired captives in New Calabar. She arrived at Kingston, Jamaica, on 28 November with 268 captives. She sailed from Kingston on 27 April 1808 and arrived in Liverpool on 30 June. She had left Liverpool with 33 crew members and she suffered five crew deaths on the voyage.

Captain Archibald Keenan acquired a letter of marque on 10 October 1808.

 
Captain Alexander Scotland acquired a letter of marque on 25 September 1809.

Fate
Grand Napoleon, of 16 guns and 120 men, was out thirteen days from Brest, France. Backhouse arrived at Morlaix. LR for 1811 carried the annotation "captured" beneath Backhouses name.

Grand Napoléon put Captain Scotland, his passengers, and his crew on a brig that had been sailing from New Brunswick to Cork when the brig was captured. The privateer gave up the brig to the prisoners.

Notes

Citations

References
 
 
 

1798 ships
Age of Sail merchant ships of England
Liverpool slave ships
Captured ships